Kyle Krpata is a retired American soccer goalkeeper who played professionally in the Continental Indoor Soccer League.  He was the 1994 USISL Goalkeeper of the Year.

Krpata graduated from Bellarmine College Preparatory.  He attended Stanford University, where he played soccer from 1989 to 1992.  In 1993, Krpata played for the Palo Alto Firebirds.  In 1994, Krpata was selected as USISL Goalkeeper of the Year while playing for the San Francisco United All-Blacks.  In 1995, Krpata decided to pursue a legal career and entered Southern Methodist University.  The Dallas Sidekicks heard that Krpata was in town and invited him to attend a training camp.  He impressed the team enough to gain a contract for the summer of 1995.  Krpata retired at the end of the season.

External links
 Dallas Sidekicks: Kyle Krpata

References

Living people
1971 births
American soccer players
Continental Indoor Soccer League players
Dallas Sidekicks (CISL) players
Palo Alto Firebirds players
San Francisco United All Blacks players
Stanford Cardinal men's soccer players
USISL players
Soccer players from California
Association football goalkeepers